Matthew Alan (born Matthew Gerbig, c. 1979) is an American actor.

Early life
Alan was raised in Evansville, Indiana, where he graduated from Reitz High School in 1996. He went on to obtain a degree from Western Kentucky University in 2000. His parents are Karen and Larry Gerbig.

Career
Alan's early work includes the Bud Light beer television commercial "The Lucky Chair", with Stevie Wonder, that premiered during the 2013 Super Bowl. As Matthew Gerbig, he appeared in the films Charlie's War (2003) and Bell Witch Haunting (2004) before taking his stage name. Alan's work includes a recurring role in 2007 on the CBS streaming series Ghost Whisperer: The Other Side, a companion to the network series Ghost Whisperer, and in 2017 and 2018 on the Netflix series 13 Reasons Why; and the recurring role of Chris Merrill in the Hulu series Castle Rock.

He additionally has appeared in TV series including Veronica Mars, Lost, Modern Family. The Mentalist and Grey's Anatomy, and in films including Walking the Halls and Red Tails (both 2012), Hidden in the Woods (2014), and Trust Fund (2016). He is also a producer of the short film Bowman (2011).

A 2009 Folger's coffee commercial with actress Catherine Combs, which became a Christmastime staple for several years, developed a fan following over what some perceived as romantic undertones between siblings, inspiring comedy sketches from Daniel Tosh and Chelsea Handler.

Personal life
Alan is married to English actress Camilla Luddington. The couple's daughter Hayden was born in March 2017. Alan proposed to Luddington on December 31, 2017, and they married in August 2019.  Their son Lucas born in August 2020.

Filmography

Film

Television

Video games

References

External links

American male film actors
Living people
1979 births